Friedrich Heinrich Häberlin (16 December 1834, in Bissegg – 16 October 1897) was a Swiss politician and President of the Swiss National Council (1889/1890).

His brother Eduard Häberlin (1820–1884) was President of the Swiss Council of States (1863).

His son Heinrich Häberlin (1868–1947) became a member of the Federal Council (1920–1934).

External links 
 
 

1834 births
1897 deaths
People from Weinfelden District
Swiss Calvinist and Reformed Christians
Members of the National Council (Switzerland)
Presidents of the National Council (Switzerland)